The Verkhnechonskoye field is a giant oil field in Eastern Siberia, Russia. It is considered the largest oil field in Eastern Siberia.

The field was discovered in 1978 and development started in 2002. Pilot operation of the field was started in 2005 and on 15 October 2008, first oil produced at the Verkhnechonskoye field was delivered. Natural gas reserves are 95.5 billion cubic meters. The field is operated by Verkhnechonskneftegaz, a joint venture of TNK-BP (68.51%), Rosneft (25.94%), and East Siberian Gas Co. (5.48%).

Produced oil is shipped by an  pipeline to Surgutneftegaz' Talakan field where it supplied to the Eastern Siberia – Pacific Ocean oil pipeline.

References 

Oil fields of Russia
Rosneft